In mathematics, Chihara polynomials may refer to one of the families of orthogonal polynomials studied by Theodore Seio Chihara, including

Al-Salam–Chihara polynomials
Brenke–Chihara polynomials
Chihara–Ismail polynomials